The 2017–18 Maryland Terrapins women's basketball team represented the University of Maryland, College Park in 2017–18 NCAA Division I women's basketball season. The Terrapins, led by sixteenth year head coach Brenda Frese, played their home games at the Xfinity Center as members of the Big Ten Conference. They finished the season 26–8, 12–4 in Big Ten play to finish in second place. They defeated Indiana and Nebraska to advance to the championship of the Big Ten women's tournament where they lost Ohio State. They received an at-large to the NCAA women's basketball tournament as the No. 5 seed in the Kansas City region. There they defeated Princeton before losing to NC State in the Second Round.

Previous season 
The Terrapins finished the 2017–18 season 32–3, 15–1 in Big Ten play to win share the regular season title with Ohio State. They defeated Minnesota and Michigan State to advance to the championship of the Big Ten women's tournament where they defeated Purdue to win the tournament championship for the third consecutive year. As a result, they received the conference's automatic to the NCAA women's basketball tournament as the No. 3 seed in the Bridgeport region. There they defeated Bucknell and West Virginia to advance to the Sweet Sixteen before losing to Oregon.

Roster

Schedule and results

|-
!colspan=9 style=| Non-conference regular season

|-

|-

|-

|-

|-

|-

|-

|-

|-
!colspan=9 style=| Big Ten regular season

|-

|-

|-

|-

|-

|-

|-

|-

|-

|-

|-

|-

|-

|-

|-

|-
!colspan=9 style=| Big Ten Women's Tournament'''

|-
!colspan=9 style=|NCAA Women's Tournament

Source

Rankings
2017–18 NCAA Division I women's basketball rankings

See also
2017–18 Maryland Terrapins men's basketball team

References

External links
 Official Team Website

Maryland Terrapins women's basketball seasons
Maryland
Maryland
Maryland
Maryland